Eye to the Telescope is the debut studio album by Scottish singer-songwriter KT Tunstall, originally released on 13 December 2004 and re-released 10 January 2005 by Relentless Records. On 19 July 2005, it was nominated for the 2005 Mercury Music Prize in the United Kingdom. Tunstall promoted the album in the United States and Canada in December 2005. The album was released on 7 February 2006 in the US. Also, a special CD/DVD edition of the album was released in September 2006 in the United States, along with a different cover and a bonus track.

The album was a strong seller worldwide, and became the 50th best-selling album of the 2000s decade in the United Kingdom.

Critical reception

Reviews for Eye to the Telescope were positive. Mark A. Price of PopMatters gave the album a score of 7 out of 10, noting that it manages to sound "both new and familiar", mixing influences from artists like Melissa Etheridge and Fiona Apple, while adding some originality of her own. Stephen Thomas Erlewine of AllMusic gave it three and a half stars out of five, calling it "a promising, satisfying debut". On Metacritic, Eye to the Telescope has a score of 76 out of 100, indicating "generally favorable reviews".

Chart performance
The album entered the UK album chart at 73 and quickly dropped out again (it originally entered the lower regions of the Top 200 in its debut week, but these placings are not officially recorded for statistical purposes). It re-entered at 66 a few weeks later, and its rise was both surprising and unique for a new album on the UK charts. It improved every week for four weeks before peaking at number 36, then dropping down as low as 63 again. It then resumed a somewhat meteoric rise, culminating in a peak of number seven before slowly shifting back down. The publicity surrounding Tunstall's Mercury Music Prize nomination sent it back up the charts to an eventual peak of No. 3, after which time it became a Top 20 mainstay for the rest of 2005. It dropped out of the Top 10 in the 61st week, and has dropped continually since, before ending its run at 72 weeks. After a several month absence, the album returned at No. 66 for a 73rd non-consecutive week in August 2006.

The singles from the album became increasingly more successful, with "Other Side of the World" spending almost five months on the chart and "Suddenly I See" remaining in the Top 40 for 10 weeks. The album's next single, "Under the Weather", entered the chart at No. 39, while the fifth and final single, "Another Place to Fall", became Tunstall's first single to miss the Top 40 after more than 1.3 million copies of the album had been sold. In total, Tunstall has spent 133 weeks so far on the British charts.

The album was certified 5× platinum by the Irish album chart selling about 75,000 copies, and shipping 1.5 million copies in the UK, certifying it 5× platinum there as well. It was also certified platinum in Canada in January 2007. Worldwide, the album has sold 2.6 million copies.

Track listing
All tracks produced by Steve Osborne, except for track 1, "Other Side of the World", which is produced by Osborne and Martin Terefe, and track 4, "Black Horse and the Cherry Tree", which is produced by Andy Green.

The original edition of the album, released in December 2004, had a slightly different track order and did not include the studio version of "Black Horse and the Cherry Tree"; the version of the track recorded on Later... with Jools Holland was included as a "bonus live track".

Personnel
Credits adapted from the album's liner notes.
 KT Tunstall – vocals (tracks 1–4, 6, 8–9, 11–12, Lead: 5, 7, 10), guitar (1–11), wurlitzer (1, 10), pianet (3, 7), Shelltone horn (3), piano (2, 5, 8, 12), Doepfer bass (4, 7), chimes (8), additional percussion (4)
 Steve Osborne – shelltone horn (tracks 1–2), bass (2, 5, 11), additional guitar (2, 7, 10–11), percussion (5), moog synthesizer (7), background vocals (7, 10), audio mixing (10)
 Arnulf Lindner – double bass (tracks 1–2), bass guitar (3, 6, 8–9), baritone guitar (6, 9)
 Luke Bullen – drums (tracks 1–3, 5–12), percussion (3–4, 9–10), cajon (5–6, 9–10)
 Martin Terefe – additional keyboards (track 1)
 Ian Burdge – cello (tracks 2, 10)

Charts

Weekly charts

Year-end charts

Decade-end charts

All-time charts

Certifications

Release history

References

2004 debut albums
KT Tunstall albums
Albums produced by Steve Osborne
European Border Breakers Award-winning albums